James Martinez may refer to:
 James Martinez (actor), American actor
 James Martinez (basketball) (born 1987), Filipino basketball player
 James Martinez (NYPD Blue), a fictional detective from the television series NYPD Blue
 James Martinez (wrestler) (born 1958), American wrestler